A by-election was held for the New South Wales Legislative Assembly electorate of The Hawkesbury on 30 July 1892 caused by the death of Alexander Bowman.

Dates

Results

Alexander Bowman died.

See also
Electoral results for the district of Hawkesbury
List of New South Wales state by-elections

Notes

References

1892 elections in Australia
New South Wales state by-elections
1890s in New South Wales